The 1993 Amstel Gold Race was the 28th edition of the annual road bicycle race "Amstel Gold Race", held on April 24, 1993, in the Dutch province of Limburg. The race stretched 249 kilometres, with the start in Heerlen and the finish in Maastricht. There were a total of 158 competitors, with 87 cyclists finishing the race.

Result

External links
Results

Amstel Gold Race
1993 in road cycling
1993 in Dutch sport
Amstel Gold Race
April 1993 sports events in Europe